Colonel Thomas Ewing (1730-1790) was a commander of the 3rd Battalion of the Maryland Flying Camp under the command of Brigadier General Rezin Beall during the American Revolutionary War.  Under Ewing's command were 12 companies of infantry with 864 men and 2 companies of artillery.

References

Continental Army officers from Maryland
People of colonial Maryland
1730 births
1790 deaths